Chaenotheca brachypoda is a species of lichen in the family Coniocybaceae. It was first described in 1816 by Erik Acharius as Coniocybe brachypoda. Leif Tibell transferred it to the genus Chaenotheca in 1987.

References

Pezizomycotina
Lichen species
Lichens described in 1816
Fungi of North America
Taxa named by Erik Acharius